Cao Rui (died 13 June 233) was a prince in the state of Cao Wei in the Three Kingdoms period of China. He was a son of Cao Pi, the first emperor of Wei. His mother, whose family name was Pan (潘), was a concubine of Cao Pi holding the rank of shuyuan (淑媛; translated "Decent Concubine"). He was enfeoffed as the Prince of Yangping County (陽平縣王) in 226 after his half-brother, Cao Rui (曹叡; note the different character for Rui), succeeded their father as the emperor of Wei (with the posthumous title of "Emperor Ming of Wei"). In 232, his title was changed to Prince of Beihai (北海王). He died in 233 and had no offspring.

In 234, Since Cao Rui (曹蕤) had no descendants, Emperor Ming designated Cao Zan (曹贊), a descendant of Cao Ju, as (deceased) Cao Rui's heir and enfeoffed him as the Duke of Chang District (昌鄉公). In 238, Cao Zan was promoted to Prince of Rao'an (饒安王). In 246, during the reign of Cao Fang, Cao Zan's title was changed to Prince of Wen'an (文安王). Throughout the reigns of the subsequent Wei emperors, the number of taxable households in Cao Zan's princedom increased until it reached 3,500.

See also
 Cao Wei family trees#Ladies Pan, Zhu, and Qiu
 Lists of people of the Three Kingdoms

Notes

References

 Chen, Shou (3rd century). Records of the Three Kingdoms (Sanguozhi).

Year of birth unknown
233 deaths
Cao Wei imperial princes